Escape to the Chateau is a Channel 4 reality television series which follows the story of couple Dick Strawbridge and Angel Adoree along with their family as they buy and renovate the 19th-century Château de la Motte-Husson in Martigné-sur-Mayenne, France, while simultaneously raising two young children and starting a business hosting weddings and other events. 

The first season follows Dick and Angel's quest to restore the derelict château from its uninhabitable state by installing running water, heating and electricity throughout the 45-room home, which had not been lived in for the previous forty years. They are working against a deadline – their own wedding, which is to be held at the property. The subsequent seasons continue the story as they grow their special events business while proceeding with more renovations and maintenance of the château and its grounds, as well as document the family events and milestones going on around them.

A full nine series of the programme were filmed with the first episode of Series 9 first airing on Channel 4 in the UK on 30 October 2022. This was said to be the final series, a decision made with the agreement of Dick and Angel Strawbridge.

Cast information

Dick Strawbridge
Formerly a Lieutenant Colonel in the British Army, engineer Dick Strawbridge has appeared on numerous television shows, including It's Not Easy Being Green (2006), Coast (2006), Scrapheap Challenge (2009), The Hungry Sailors (2011), Saturday Farm (2011) and Dirty Rotten Survival (2015). In Escape to the Chateau, his engineering and cooking experience is highlighted, with his can-do attitude and mechanical expertise at the fore, as work on the château and its surrounding land continues through the seasons.

Angel Adoree 
Angel Adoree, who runs a hospitality business called The Vintage Patisserie, for which she sought investment when she appeared on Dragon's Den in 2010, provides a creative factor and flair for the show, adding her style and interior-decoration skill to the château, as well as sharing in the interest in hospitality and entertaining to make lasting memories for their guests. Adoree was born Angela Newman and grew up on Canvey Island, where her family runs a jewellers' shop.

They have two children, Arthur and Dorothy.

Episode list

Series 1

Series 2

Series 3

Series 4

Series 5

Series 6

Series 7 
Series 7 takes place during lockdown in France due to the COVID-19 pandemic and has no weddings or events at the Chateau.

Series 8

Series 9 
It’s ‘The Year of Celebrations’! Dick & Angel return for their ninth and final series.

Variant series 

A second version of series 1 was shown on More 4.
 Episode 1 is called "Hole in the Wall" (26 June 2016).
 Episode 2 is called "They're our Flies" (3 July 2016).
 Episode 3 is called "Angel's Palace of Dreams" (10 July 2016).

More 4 has shown these additional episodes as "an extended four-part version of series one". These are described as follows:
 "S1 Ep1/4 - Dick Strawbridge and Angel buy a fairy tale French chateau and set about bringing the abandoned building back to life",
 "S1 Ep2/4 - Dick, Angel and the family move into their crumbling chateau, which they find home to bats, birds and thousands of flies",
 "S1 Ep3/4 - Wanting to create a stunning honeymoon suite, Angel asks Dick to smash a hole in the three-feet-thick castle wall", and
 "S1 Ep3/3 [sic] - Dick and Angel are due to marry in just a few weeks, expecting 200 guests. But room after room still needs to be restored, decorated and furnished, and the moat needs damming."
Episode 4 of the More 4 series seems to be the third episode of the original three-part Channel 4 series.

Retrospective series 

An additional three episode retrospective series began showing in late 2019. These are:
 Episode 1 is called "Escape to the Chateau : Restoring the Dream" (26 November 2019).
 Episode 2 is called "Escape to the Chateau : Designing the Dream" (2 December 2019).
 Episode 3 is called "Escape to the Chateau : The Great Outdoors" (9 December 2019).
These covered events during the first five years.

Background and production 
Dick Strawbridge invited Channel 4 to join them documenting their journey in searching for a house. The couple had already spent four years searching for a home to bring up their two young children, Arthur and Dorothy. In contrast to many other home shows, the television coverage was never planned, but Channel 4 paid to document the journey which lifted some of the weight that such a large task would cost. This was in the form of the presenter's fee, in addition to the exposure from the show's advertising, which has allowed the business to uphold its popularity as a wedding and events venue.

The appeal of the show may be due to the affordability on face value and lack of demand for such French properties, which has attracted many English house buyers. That was the same story with Dick and Angel, since when they first started house hunting in France, they were looking at more modest properties such as small farmhouses, until they realised that at the prevailing low prices, they could buy a castle.

In 2015, for £280,000, they purchased a chateau that listed forty-five rooms and a walled garden and was surrounded by a moat on a  property, ten times larger than the average British house. Despite the apparent advantages, however, the show has made viewers aware of the large restoration and running costs of such projects, which can become costly for people trying to make a business out of these castles, as well as the significant personal effort required.

American broadcast
Escape to the Chateau premiered in the United States on local PBS stations.

On 5 December 2020, episodes started to air on HGTV. The first one hour episode of the series was titled "Meet the Chateau", which featured Dick and Angel purchasing the property (including the walled garden), moving in, and then installing electricity and a heating system.

History of Château de la Motte-Husson 

From the 12th to 14th centuries, the site of the Chateau was used as a fortified stronghold in the parish of La Motte. In 1406, the Husson family, seigneurs of Montgiroux, named the castle Château de la Motte-Husson.

The Baglion de la Dufferie family (a French branch of the Baglioni family of Perugia) acquired the estate in 1600. After that, it was rebuilt within the square moat during the period from 1868 to 1874. The current façade is reflective of the efforts of Countess Louise-Dorothée de Baglion de la Dufferie (1826–1902), who told her husband that she wanted a grand residence. The chateau served as a summer home for the family.

Related series

Escape to the Chateau DIY 
Escape to the Chateau DIY follows Dick and Angel giving their tips to other immigrants to France (including British, Dutch, and American expatriates) who are trying to run businesses from châteaux in conditions similar to their own. The series documents various renovations and looks at possibilities for generating profit. The show was planned to have four series. The initial broadcast was on 9 April 2018, and the third series concluded on 15 November 2019. The fourth series commenced broadcasting on 20 March 2020.

References

External links 

Escape to the Chateau DIY – châteaux contact list

2016 British television series debuts
2010s British reality television series
2020s British reality television series
Business-related television series in the United Kingdom
Channel 4 original programming
English-language television shows
Home renovation television series
Television shows set in France